Calcutta International Cult Films Festival is an ISO 9001:2015 Certified Organization  and an IMDb Award Qualifying International Film Festival. It is an annual major award screening event that takes place in Kolkata and features cult films from around the world. The CICFF was started in 2016.

At least one film from each category receives an award each month out of the more than 50 that are formally selected from the various categories. The most notable films are frequently presented in Calcutta and given a complimentary, thorough academic evaluation that is published in a number of international film journals. The Final Winners get the Golden Fox Awards and are screened in front of a live audience in the theatre in Kolkata after the CICFF community selects the Best of the Best.

The CICFF winners are put forward for the GOLDEN FOX AWARDS. The most recent Golden Fox Awards were held in Kolkata's Rotary Sadan in January 2022.

Awardees 
The award is given out each year for significant movies and people in a variety of categories.

2023 
Starship Troopers: Deadlock - Best Debut Filmmaker and Nominee Golden Fox Award 2023

2021 
AK Srikanth directed Best short film 2021

2020 
The Great Artist - Best Film Score - Soundtrack 2020

2019 
Kadha Paranja Kadha - Nominee Golden Fox Award 2019
Love Eterne - Best Music Video 2019
Laura Van Yck 2019

References

Film festivals established in 2016
Culture of Kolkata
2016 establishments in West Bengal
Events in Kolkata